Muhoorthangal is a 1977 Indian Malayalam film, directed by P. M. Benny. The film stars Srividya, KPAC Sunny, M. G. Soman and Rani Chandra in the lead roles. The film has musical score by M. K. Arjunan.

Cast
Srividya 
KPAC Sunny 
M. G. Soman 
Rani Chandra 
Sudheer

Soundtrack
The music was composed by M. K. Arjunan and the lyrics were written by ONV Kurup.

References

External links
 

1977 films
1970s Malayalam-language films